The Texan is a 1932 American Western film directed by Clifford S. Smith, starring Jay Wilsey, Lucile Browne, and Bobby Nelson.

Cast
 Jay Wilsey (credited Buffalo Bill Jr.) as William Lloyd Rusk
 Lucile Browne as Mary Lou
 Bobby Nelson as Bobby
 Lafe McKee
 Jack Mower
 Art Mix
 Duke R. Lee

References

1932 films
American Western (genre) films
American black-and-white films
Films directed by Clifford Smith
1930s American films